James Moore (November 23, 1869 – May 23, 1946) was a merchant and politician in Newfoundland. He represented Carbonear in the Newfoundland House of Assembly from 1923 to 1932.

He was born in Carbonear and was educated there. After completing his school, Moore took over the operation of the family business. He was an unsuccessful candidate for the Newfoundland assembly in 1919. He was elected in 1923 as a Liberal-Labour-Progressive member and was reelected in 1928 as a United Newfoundland Party member. He died in Carbonear at the age of 76.

References 

1869 births
1946 deaths
Newfoundland People's Party MHAs
United Newfoundland Party MHAs